Constituencies of Tonga are used for elections to the Legislative Assembly of Tonga.

List of constituencies

People's representatives
 Tongatapu 1
 Tongatapu 2
 Tongatapu 3
 Tongatapu 4
 Tongatapu 5
 Tongatapu 6
 Tongatapu 7
 Tongatapu 8
 Tongatapu 9
 Tongatapu 10
 ʻEua 11
 Haʻapai 12
 Haʻapai 13
 Vavaʻu 14
 Vavaʻu 15
 Vavaʻu 16
 Niua 17

Noble representatives
 ʻEua Nobles' constituency
 Haʻapai Nobles' constituency
 Niuas Nobles' constituency
 Tongatapu Nobles' constituency
 Vavaʻu Nobles' constituency

References